Ionuț Codruț Moșteanu (born 10 August 1975) is a Romanian football manager. In his career Moșteanu worked mainly as an assistant manager, for teams such as CFR Cluj, FC Vaslui or Universitatea Craiova, among others.

References

External links
 

1975 births
Living people
Sportspeople from Bucharest
Romanian football managers
FC Vaslui managers
FC Argeș Pitești managers